Suq Al-Shuyukh Stadium (Arabic: ملعب سوق الشيوخ) is a multi-use stadium in Dhi Qar Governorate, Iraq. It is currently used mostly for football matches and serves as the home stadium of Al-Forat FC and Suq Al-Shuyukh FC. The stadium holds 5,000 people. Its construction cost approximately 7.5 million USD.

The stadium was inaugurated on 1 March 2015 by former Minister of Youth and Sports Abdul-Hussein Abtaan. The opening match was between Al-Forat FC and Al-Nasiriya FC who won 1–0.

See also 
List of football stadiums in Iraq

References

Football venues in Iraq
Athletics (track and field) venues in Iraq
Multi-purpose stadiums in Iraq
2015 establishments in Iraq
Sports venues completed in 2015